The Statute Law Revision Act 1874 (37 & 38 Vict c 35) is an Act of the Parliament of the United Kingdom. The Bill for this Act was the Statute Law Revision Bill.

It was intended, in particular, to facilitate the preparation of the revised edition of the statutes then in progress.

This Act was partly in force in Great Britain at the end of 2010.

The enactments which were repealed (whether for the whole or any part of the United Kingdom) by this Act were repealed so far as they extended to the Isle of Man on 25 July 1991.

This Act was retained for the Republic of Ireland by section 2(2)(a) of, and Part 4 of Schedule 1 to, the Statute Law Revision Act 2007.

Section 2 of the Statute Law Revision Act 1874 (No. 2) (37 & 38 Vict c 96) provided that this Act was to be read and construed as if, in the entry in the Schedule to this Act relating to the Piracy Act 1837 (7 Will 4 & 1 Vict c 88), the words "Section Six" and "Section Seven" had been substituted for the words "Section Four" and "Section Five" respectively.

Section 2
This section provided that the 55 Geo 3 c 91, which had been repealed by the Statute Law Revision Act 1873, was revived, so far as it related to the county of the city of Dublin. This section was repealed by section 1 of, and Schedule 1 to, the Statute Law Revision Act 1894 (57 & 58 Vict c 56).

Schedule
The Schedule to this Act was repealed by section 1 of, and Schedule 1 to, the Statute Law Revision Act 1894 (57 & 58 Vict c 56).

See also
Statute Law Revision Act

References
"The Statute Law Revision Act, 1874". Halsbury's Statutes of England. Second Edition. Butterworth & Co (Publishers) Ltd. Bell Yard, Temple Bar, London. 1950. Volume 24. Page 193.
William Paterson (ed). "Statute Law Revision Act". The Practical Statutes of the Session 1874. Printed by Horace Cox. Wellington Street, Strand, London. 1874. Pages 30 to 43.
John Mounteney Lely. Chitty's Collection of Statutes of Practical Utility. Fourth Edition. Henry Sweet. Stevens and Sons. Chancery Lane, London. 1880. Volume 1. Title "Act of Parliament".  Page 6.
"The Statute Law Revision Act 1874 (Imp.)". Reprinted Statutes of New Zealand. 1979. Volume 30. Page 152.
Incorporated Council of Law Reporting for England and Wales. The Law Reports: The Public General Statutes passed in the Thirty-Seventh and Thirty-Eighth Years of the Reign of Her Majesty Queen Victoria, 1874. London. 1874. Pages 183 et seq. Digitised copy from Internet Archive.

External links
List of amendments and repeals in the Republic of Ireland from the Irish Statute Book
The Statute Law Revision Act 1874, as applicable to New Zealand, from the Parliamentary Counsel Office.
  ["Note" and "Schedule" of the bill (unlike the schedule of the act as passed) gives commentary on each scheduled act, noting any earlier repeals and the reason for the new repeal]

United Kingdom Acts of Parliament 1874